RIMM  may refer to:

 Rambus In-line Memory Module, a packaging for RDRAM
 RIMM, former NASDAQ symbol for Research In Motion, a Canadian wireless device company, maker of the BlackBerry.
 Eric Rimm, American nutrition scientist
 Martin Rimm
 Sylvia Rimm (born 1935), American psychiatrist and writer
 RIMM RGB, a standard input-referred color image encoding